Zawada  (after 1936: Eichwaldau) is a district of the city of Zielona Góra, in western Poland, located in the northeastern part of the city. It was a separate village until 2014.

Zawada has a population of 1,629.

References

Neighbourhoods in Poland
Zielona Góra